Top Country Albums is a chart that ranks the top-performing country music albums in the United States, published by Billboard.  In 1979, five different albums topped the chart, which was at the time published under the title Top Country LP's, based on sales reports submitted by a representative sample of stores nationwide.

In the issue of Billboard dated January 6, Willie Nelson reached number one with the live recording Willie and Family Live, which replaced the final chart-topper of 1978, I've Always Been Crazy by Waylon Jennings.  After two weeks Nelson's album was displaced from the top of the chart by The Gambler by Kenny Rogers, who would go on to dominate the number one position during 1979.  After spending 23 non-consecutive weeks in the top spot with The Gambler, Rogers would spend a further eight weeks atop the listing with Kenny, which reached the peak position in the issue of Billboard dated November 10 and would remain there for the remainder of the year and well into 1980.  Rogers was at the peak of his career at the time, with the smooth production of his records appealing to both country and pop audiences.  Between 1978 and 1980 he reached number one on the Hot Country Singles chart with five consecutive releases, including the title track from the album The Gambler.

Waylon Jennings spent fifteen non-consecutive weeks at number one beginning in June with his album Greatest Hits.  Jennings was one of the mainstays of the outlaw country movement, which rejected the slick production values evident in popular country music of the early 1970s and added a rock music influence and a counterculture attitude.  The compilation was his biggest-selling album, and was ultimately certified quintuple-platinum by the Recording Industry Association of America.  The album's time at number one was twice interrupted by Million Mile Reflections, the first number one for the Charlie Daniels Band, which featured the group's chart-topping single "The Devil Went Down to Georgia".  Although Daniels would remain a popular concert attraction for decades, he would not achieve any further number ones on either chart.

Chart history

References

1979-related lists
1979
1979 record charts